The War Against the Jews is a 1975 book by Lucy Dawidowicz. The book researches the Holocaust of the European Jewry during World War II.

The author contends that Adolf Hitler pursued his policies to eliminate Jewish populations throughout Europe even to the detriment of pragmatic wartime actions such as moving troops and securing supply lines. As an example, Dawidowicz notes that Hitler delayed railcars providing supplies to front line troops in the Soviet Union so that Jews could be deported by rail from the USSR to death camps. She uses records of "one-way" rail tickets as additional documentation of those sent to camps.

Dawidowicz also draws a line of "anti-Semitic descent" from Martin Luther to Hitler, writing that both men were obsessed by the "demonologized universe" inhabited by Jews. She contends that similarities between Luther's anti-Jewish writings, especially On the Jews and Their Lies,  and modern anti-Semitism are no coincidence, because they derived from a common history of Judenhass (Jew-hatred), which she traces back to the biblical Haman's advice to Ahasuerus. She argues that though modern anti-Semitism has its roots in German nationalism, the foundation of Christian anti-Semitism was laid by the Catholic Church and "upon which Luther built."

The book also provides detailed listings by country of the number of Jews killed in World War II. Dawidowicz researched birth and death records in many cities of prewar Europe to come up with a death toll of 5,933,900 Jews.

Criticism by Raul Hilberg 
Raul Hilberg, widely considered to be one of the world's preeminent Holocaust scholars, published his three-volume, 1,273-page magnum opus, The Destruction of the European Jews, in 1961; this work is regarded today as a seminal study of the Nazi Final Solution. Hilberg notes that Dawidowicz not only ignored The Destruction'''s findings in The War Against the Jews, but also went on to exclude mention of him in her historiographic work, The Holocaust and the Historians, published in 1981. Hilberg's work, running as it did against the grain of intentionalist thinking, was widely unpopular among many early scholars, a contrast to later views.  It is argued that Davidowicz, a renowned intentionalist, simply ignored Hilberg's work in order to follow an academically safer path, avoiding controversy by avoiding functionalist conclusions like those drawn by Hilberg.  "She wanted preeminence," Hilberg writes.

 Jewish population listing 

 See also 
Final Solution
History of antisemitism

 Notes 

 External links The War against the Jews'' at Archive.org

1975 non-fiction books
History books about the Holocaust
Holt, Rinehart and Winston books